General Sir Reginald Seaburne May,  (10 August 1879 – 26 October 1958) was a British Army officer who served as Quartermaster-General to the Forces.

Military career
Educated at Haileybury, May was commissioned into the Royal Fusiliers as a second lieutenant on 3 August 1898, and promoted to lieutenant on 2 August 1899. He served with the 2nd battalion in the Second Boer War, where he took part in the battles of Colenso (December 1899), engagements at Pieter's Hill, Hussar Hill and Hlangwani and the Relief of Ladysmith (February 1900); and later served in the Western Transvaal under Sir Archibald Hunter. May stayed in South Africa until the end of the war, and returned home on the SS Assaye in September 1902. For his service in the war he was noted for future promotion, which followed the next year when he was promoted to captain on 3 November 1903, with the brevet rank of major from the next day.

He later served in the First World War. After the war he became Director of Movements and then, from 1923, Director of Recruiting and Organisation at the War Office. He was made Brigadier in charge of Administration at Northern Command in 1927 and then General Officer Commanding (GOC) of the 49th (West Riding) Division in 1930. He was appointed Commandant of the Royal Military College Sandhurst in 1931 and Quartermaster-General to the Forces in 1935; he retired in 1939. In retirement he was Chairman of the Toc H Christian movement for 10 years. He also served as colonel of the Royal Fusiliers.

Family
In 1906 he married Marguerite Geraldine Ramsay Drake and together they went on to have three sons. Then in 1932 he married Jane Monteith.

References

|-

|-
 

|-

1879 births
1958 deaths
Knights Commander of the Order of the Bath
Knights Commander of the Order of the British Empire
Companions of the Order of St Michael and St George
Companions of the Distinguished Service Order
Royal Fusiliers officers
British Army generals
British Army personnel of the Second Boer War
British Army personnel of World War I
People educated at Haileybury and Imperial Service College
Commandants of Sandhurst
War Office personnel in World War II